85th meridian may refer to:

85th meridian east, a line of longitude east of the Greenwich Meridian
85th meridian west, a line of longitude west of the Greenwich Meridian